The white-speckled laughingthrush (Ianthocincla bieti) is a species of passerine bird in the family Leiothrichidae. It is endemic to China. Its natural habitat is temperate forests. It is threatened by habitat loss.

The white-speckled laughingthrush was at one time placed in the genus Garrulax but following the publication of a comprehensive molecular phylogenetic study in 2018, it was moved to the resurrected genus Ianthocincla. The specific name commemorates the French missionary to China Félix Biet.

References

white-speckled laughingthrush
Birds of Central China
Birds of Yunnan
Endemic birds of China
white-speckled laughingthrush
Taxonomy articles created by Polbot
Taxobox binomials not recognized by IUCN